Hollowpox: The Hunt for Morrigan Crow is a 2020 novel written by Jessica Townsend and published by Little, Brown and Company. It is the third installment in The Nevermoor series and was released on September 29 in Australia, October 15 in the United Kingdom, and October 27 in the United States. The book will be followed by an untitled sequel. The book follows Morrigan Crow, who was cursed after being born on Eventide day, and was supposed to die on her eleventh birthday, but is saved by the mysterious Jupiter North and taken to the wonderful city of Nevermoor. In Hollowpox, Morrigan continues her adventure and must control her Wundersmith powers that threaten to destroy her.

Characters 

 Morrigan Crow: a young girl who escaped her fate and was whisked away by Jupiter to come live in Nevermoor. Originally, she was an illegal resident of the free state, but after she bested hundreds of other children to earn a spot in the Wundrous Society, she became a legal inhabitant of the country. Morrigan was told by Ezra Squall that she is a Wundersmith, whose knack is to control the Wunder in the air around her.
 Jupiter North: Morrigan's patron for her Wundrous Society trials. Jupiter takes Morrigan in after she was said to have died on Eventide day and helps her escape from the Hunt of Smoke and Shadow, led by Wundersmith Ezra Squall. North runs the Hotel Deucalion, a prestigious hotel, in which many residents live permanently, including Morrigan, Jupiter's nephew Jack, and singer Dame Chanda Kali.
 Hawthorne Swift: Morrigan's friend who has a knack for dragon riding. In the first two books, Morrigan and Hawthorne grow close and spend much time at each other's house. In Nevermoor: The Trials of Morrigan Crow, Hawthorne accompanies Morrigan and Fenestra to the Black Parade on Hallowmas and he and his friend make it through the Fright Trial together. Hawthorne is also a member of Unit 919 in the Wundrous Society. His patron is Nan Dawson.
Marina Cheery: the conductor of Unit 919's home train who is always happy and glad. Miss Cheery "lives up to her name," as Morrigan has said in the book, and also appears in Wundersmith: The Calling of Morrigan Crow. She is friends with Roshni Singh, a librarian who calls her Maz as a nickname.
Rook Rosenfeld: the Scholar Mistress of the School of Wundrous Arts. She lives in the same body as the Scholar Mistresses of the Schools of Mundane and Arcane Arts.
Sofia and Conall O'Leary: members of the School of Wundrous Arts. They are two of approximately fifteen students at the Wunsoc campus in the school, but there are many others spread throughout the city. They meet Morrigan when Rook introduces her to the school. Sofia is a Foxwun Major.
Ezra Squall: the infamous Wundersmith who massacred the other Wundersmiths in Courage Square 100 years ago, under the pretense that "Wundersmiths don't have friends." He serves as an antagonist in the series, and throughout Hollowpox: The Hunt for Morrigan Crow, he tries to get Morrigan to be his apprentice, and he even offers to cure Hollowpox to get her to do it.
Fenestra: a giant cat, called a Magnificat, that serves as the head of housekeeping in the Hotel Deucalion. Fen, as she is called, has a short temper and often leaves fishes and rodents in peoples' beds when she is displeased with them. Morrigan encountered Magnificats in the Wintersea Republic, where she grew up, but has never known they could talk.
The members of Unit 919, which also includes Morrigan and Hawthorne, appear in the books: Mahir Ibrahim, Lambeth Amara, Francis Fitzwilliams, Thaddea Macleod, Archan Tate, Anah Kahlo, and Cadence Blackburn.

Plot 
On the last day of their first year in the Wundrous Society, the members of Unit 919 partake in a class called Containment & Distraction, as an intro to the harder class they will have to take the following year. Later, at a Wundrous Society meeting, one man asks for volunteers to lower the population of the Nevermoorian Scaly Sewer Beast, a species that dwells in Nevermoor and is approaching its breeding season. Thaddea volunteers for the task force, much to everyone else's surprise, and the leader of the group, Gavin Squires, and Holliday Wu from the Public Distraction Department, try to brainstorm ideas for ways to distract the non-Wundrous Society citizens of Nevermoor from the hunt for the beast so as not to cause a panic. Meanwhile, after returning to the Hotel Deucalion, Jupiter bakes her an intricate cake for not being able to tell her about Containment & Distraction and notes that they are approaching Christmas. Later, at the Christmas parade, Morrigan sees Hawthorne, and afterwards the two—along with Hawthorne's family—go home on the bus, on which Hawthorne's toddler sister, Baby Dave, causes trouble, and is attacked by a leopard Wunimal, called a Leopardwun. Fenestra picks Morrigan up and she senses her acting unusual. At a Christmas dinner, Dame Chanda Kali reveals that her favorite fashion designer was a Wunimal who looked similar, and the hotel staff–Morrigan included—begin to worry. Later, during her first day of school of the New Year, a new teacher, Rosenfeld, confronts Morrigan and takes her to the School of Wundrous Arts, where anyone can train in skills like Professor Onstald's to stop time, and learn about Wundersmiths.

Morrigan meets her fellow students, Conall and Sofia. Later, Morrigan is threatened by a rabid Bearwun and Dame Chanda Kali is attacked by a Horsewun. Morrigan keeps noticing a strange green light in their eyes as they go crazy. Dame Chanda explains that only a few decades ago, Wunimals were treated as less than human, as if they had the intelligence of a common house pet. In the Wundrous Society, Wunimals are warned of the virus that infects only them, causing them to act aggressively and become catatonic and "hollow," which is also dubbed "Hollowpox." When the society's condition worsens, Jupiter and Jack are put to work using their Witness powers to find infected Wunimals. Meanwhile, Unit 919 is forced to continue classes, with Morrigan retreating more and more often to the School of Wundrous Arts, where she finds a book, The Book of Ghostly Hours, where she can relive experiences and lessons of Wundersmiths of the past, who really weren't all evil. Unit 919's disruption and distraction classes, including What's That Behind You? and What's That Smell?, have been happening more frequently, and Morrigan later competes in a challenge in the class where they must go out into the city, and a) cause a panic, b) steal something, and c) don't get caught, during which Miss Cheery suggest that, Morrigan, Thaddea, and Mahir visit the Golbeian Library, which is really a giant library hidden in a pocket dimension.

While there, Morrigan plots to steal the first volume in the book series that Onstald rewrote, realizing that the unabridged version of the text is favorable to Wundersmiths. Morrigan and the others are attacked by insects that have emerged from a book, and while an elite team deals with them, Wunimal Colin becomes infected with Hollowpox. The children escape, but the librarian Roshni Singh is infuriated. Gideon Steed, an anti-Wunimal rights senator, begins pounding the Wunimals in the press, saying they should be locked up together or banned from city establishment, much to Morrigan, Jupiter, and the rest of the Hotel Deucalion staff's horror. When Morrigan accidentally reveals her Wundersmith abilities to the non-Wundrous Society public, Steed switches to her, provoking newspapers to claim that she is not an actual Wundersmith, and offers a large reward to anybody who can photograph her using her abilities. This leads Morrigan to spend more time in the School of Wundrous Arts, where she practices the Wundrous Art of the Inferno, and subsequently meets with The Kindling, a Wundrous deity, who dubs her a master. Upon returning to the school on level Sub-Nine of Wunsoc campus, Morrigan stumbles across Sofia, a Wunimal, infected by Hollowpox. When Fenestra reveals that she harbors Wunimals from the Wintersea Republic, Morrigan's home state, where they don't have rights, Morrigan begins to theorize that that is where Hollowpox originated, though Fenestra denies it. Morrigan travels to the Republic through the Gossamer, where she is found by President Wintersea, whose real name is Maud Lowry.

Lowry admits that her state has developed a Hollowpox cure, and promises Morrigan that she will try to distribute the cure across Nevermoor and the Free State. Morrigan decides to visit Crow Manor, her old house, and see her old stuffed rabbit, Emmett, being played with by Guntram and Wolfram, Morrigan's half-brothers. Gideon steed almost meets with Lowry, but doesn't and Morrigan learns from Squall, who comes to her, that Lowry actually commissioned him to create Hollowpox. He helps Morrigan eradicate the virus, even though she doesn't want to, and she almost dies due to exertion and the fact that multiple infected Wunimals converge on her in the moment. Morrigan wakes up two days later in the hospital, with everyone she cares about by her side, including Hawthorne, Cadence, Fenestra, and Jupiter. When she learns that more Wunimals are waking up as unnimals—normal animals—some are waking up intelligent, and some aren't waking up at all, she calls Squall to her. Squall tells her that there is no way to get the Wunimals back, but she refuses to believe him, and instead demands that he unmake the Hollowpox, as he was the one that made it. In exchange, she will become his student. Squall agrees, unmaking the Hollowpox. And Morrigan agrees to become his student, eager to learn more about the wondrous arts, signing a contract binding her to become Squall's student.  Finally, she returns home to the Hotel Deucalion and rests.

Development 
Hollowpox: The Hunt for Morrigan Crow was published in September and October, in Australia, the United Kingdom, and the United States, respectively. Originally, the book had a late Winter release schedule planned out, but the publication date was pushed back to late Summer, July and August, due to the COVID-19 pandemic. Finally, the release was pushed back once again to an early fall date, which is when the book was actually published. Hollowpox is 560 pages long, making it the longest book in The Nevermoor series so far.

Reception

Reviews 
The book review site Better Reading said that Hollowpox: The Hunt for Morrigan Crow was "a fast-paced thriller that presents moral dilemmas and raises questions about personal and societal ethics" and it was the "darkest" of the three books currently released in the series. MuggleNet called Townsend's imagination "boundless" and "Wundrous" in addition to saying that the main protagonist, Morrigan Crow, was "at times timid, at times powerful, and always hungry for both affection and learning." BookTopia noted that the writing style and plot were both "so much fun" to read and the "many surprise reveals and unexpected turns" greatly enhanced the story. "This is such an engaging and magical series, on par with other fantastic reads, like Harry Potter," said Olivia Farr of Books Central in a review, comparying the book to the works of J. K. Rowling. Another book-review site has called Hollowpox "charming and unapologetically whimsical."

Awards 
Hollowpox: The Hunt for Morrigan Crow is the winner of the Waterstones Children's Book Prize in 2020 and was shortlisted for the 2021 Australian Book Industry Awards, Book of the year for younger children (ages 7–12).

Sequels 
The book is the third installment in The Nevermoor series, and is expected to be followed by an unnamed fourth novel as well. In May 2019, fifth and sixth installments in the series were officially announced by Hachette Book Group. On the topic, Townsend said, "I'm thrilled to be growing and deepening this series, and can't wait to tell Morrigan Crow's next three stories after Hollowpox." In an interview, Townsend also revealed that she has plots planned out for three more books after the first six that have been announced officially.

References 

2020 Australian novels
Little, Brown and Company books
Australian fantasy novels